The Thousandaire is an album by Vallejo, California rapper Jay Tee, from N2Deep/Latino Velvet.

Track listing 
"Let's Get It On"
"Sexy Flame"
"Get Together"
"It Ain't Even Like That"
"One Night" (featuring Val Young)
"You Told Me"
"Feelin' You"
"Take My Hand"
"Heavy on Mind"
"She's My Homie"
"Every Minute" (featuring Young Dru)

Sources
[ AllMusic link]
40 Ounce Records link

Jay Tee albums
2005 albums